Devthana is a village located in Dharur tehsil of Beed district. It belongs to Majalgaon constituency of Maharashtra legislative assembly.

Administration 

As per Constitution of India and Panchayat Raj Act, Devthana village is administered by Sarpanch and 9 members of Gram Panchayat under Dharur Panchayat Samiti and Beed Zilla Parishad.

Demographics 
Devthana Population figures as of 2011 Census of India

Education 

1. Zilla Parishad School, Devthana

2. Maharashtra Vidyalaya, Moha (9 km)

3. Indira Gandhi Highschool, Dindrud (10 km)

4. Yogeshvari Nutan Vidyalaya, Amabajogai (30 km)

5. SRT Mahavidyalaya, Ambajogai (30 km)

Transport 

◆Nearest Railway Station - Parli Vaijnath (30 km away)

◆Nearest Airport - Aurangabad (195 km away)

Important Government Offices 

◆ Tehsil office, Dharur (40 km away)

◆ Deputy Collector SDM office, Majalgaon (40 km away)

◆ Collector DM Office, Beed (70 km away)

◆ Police Station, Sirsala (10 km away)

◆ Panchayat Samiti, Dharur

Temples 
●Dakshinmukhi Hanuman Mandir, Devthana

●Lonari Devi Mandir, Devthana

●Vitthal Mandir, Devthana 

●Vaijnath Jyotirling Mandir, Parli Vaijnat (30 km)

●Mahadeo Mandir, Tapovan (10 km)

●Yogeshvari Devi Mandir, Ambajogai (30 km)

Hospitals 
• Swami Ramanand Tirth Government Medical   Hospital, Ambajogai (30 km)

Banks 
◆ State Bank of India, Parli Vaijnat (30 km)

◆ Maharashtra Gramin Bank, Moha (10 km)

◆ HDFC Bank, Parli Vaijnath (30 km)

◆ Ambajogai People's Bank, Sirsala (10 km)

Sugar Factory 
• Sundarrao Solanke Sahakari Sakhar Karkhana, Sundarnagar, Telgaon (20 km away)

Important Family 
■ Solanke

See also 

1. Sundarrao Solanke

2. Prakashdada Solanke

References 

Villages in Beed district